Operation Observant Compass was a United States Department of Defense operation initially focused on apprehending Joseph Kony and the Lord's Resistance Army in Central Africa. It was overseen by United States Africa Command.
NBC News wrote in March 2017 that "The area of operations is the size of California, with about 80 military personnel and several dozen support personnel tasked with finding around 150 fighters with Kony's Lord's Resistance Army, operating across portions of four countries in some of the world's most inaccessible terrain."

In 2017, with around $780 million spent on the operation, and Kony still in the field, the United States wound down Observant Compass and shifted its forces elsewhere. But the operation didn't completely disband, according to the Defense Department: “U.S. military forces supporting Operation Observant Compass transitioned to broader scope security and stability activities that continue the success of our African partners."

References

Observant Compass
Military of Uganda
Military history of the Democratic Republic of the Congo